Business identification number or BIN is a proposed identification number to replace eighteen different registration numbers required to be obtained by a company to operate in India. Business identification number or BIN is a proposed identification number to replace eighteen different registration numbers required to be obtained by a company to operate in India. The Ministry of Statistics and Programme Implementation is looking at allotting a 16-digit number to each business establishment. Apart from helping the government create and maintain a comprehensive database on businesses, the unique number will also simplify a business's dealings with various governmental agencies by reducing chances of duplicate entities, resolving identity issues and saving time when going for future registrations or licences.

References

Business in India
Company identification numbers
Companies of India
Identity documents of India